The South African Railways Class 6E1, Series 5 of 1974 was an electric locomotive.

Between 1974 and 1976, the South African Railways placed one hundred ,  electric locomotives with a Bo-Bo wheel arrangement in mainline service. One of them was later withdrawn from revenue service for use as an experimental 25 kV AC locomotive.

Manufacturer
The 3 kV DC Class 6E1, Series 5 electric locomotive was designed and built for the South African Railways (SAR) by Union Carriage & Wagon (UCW) in Nigel, Transvaal, with the electrical equipment being supplied by the General Electric Company (GEC).

One hundred units were delivered between 1974 and 1976, numbered in the range from E1546 to E1645. Like Series 1 to 4, Series 5 units were equipped with four AEI-283AZ axle-hung traction motors. UCW did not allocate builder's numbers to the locomotives it built for the SAR and used the SAR unit numbers for their record keeping.

Characteristics

Orientation

These dual cab locomotives had a roof access ladder on one side only, just to the right of the cab access door. The roof access ladder end was marked as the no. 2 end. A corridor along the centre of the locomotive connected the cabs which were identical apart from the fact that the handbrake was located in cab 2. A pantograph hook stick was stowed in a tube mounted below the lower edge of the locomotive body on the roof access ladder side. The units had one square and two rectangular access panels along the lower half of the body on the roof access ladder side, and only square access panel on the opposite side.

Series identifying features

The Class 6E1 was produced in eleven series over a period of nearly sixteen years. While some Class 6E1 series are visually indistinguishable from their predecessors or successors, some externally visible changes did occur over the years.

The Series 3 to Series 5 locomotives were visually indistinguishable from each other, the only externally visible difference being the narrower stirrup middle step below the side doors of the first fifty Series 3 units, those in the number range from E1296 to E1345.

The Series 6 and 7 locomotives are also visually indistinguishable from each other, but can be distinguished from all the older series by the rainwater beading that had been added above the small grilles on the sides aft of the side doors.

Service
The Class 6E1 family saw service all over both 3 kV DC mainline and branch line networks, the smaller Cape Western mainline between Cape Town and Beaufort West and the larger network which covers portions of the Northern Cape, the Free State, Natal, Gauteng, North West and Mpumalanga.

Reclassification and rebuilding

Test bed for 25 kV AC research

One of the Series 5 units, no. E1600, was withdrawn from revenue service in 1978, rebuilt as a test-bed for  electrification and reclassified to Class Experimental AC. This was done while the electrification of the four isolated  routes was in progress. No. E1600 was never returned to revenue service. The four 25 kV AC routes are:
 From Pyramid South to Pietersburg and via Rustenburg to Thabazimbi.
 From Ermelo to Richards Bay.
 From Port Elizabeth to De Aar and from there northward to Kimberley and southward to Beaufort West.
 From East London to Springfontein.

No. E1600 is set to be preserved for the national collection by the SA Heritage Agency and Transnet Heritage Foundation.(stored Pyramid south 03/2020)

Reclassification to Class 16E

During 1990 and 1991, Spoornet semi-permanently coupled several pairs of otherwise largely unmodified Class 6E1 units, reclassified them to Class 16E and allocated a single locomotive number to each pair, with the individual units in the pairs inscribed "A" or "B". The aim was to accomplish savings on cab maintenance by coupling the units at their no. 1 ends, abandoning the no. 1 end cabs in terms of maintenance and using only the no. 2 end cabs.

Two known Series 5 locomotives, numbers E1549 and E1607, were part of such Class 16E pairs and became Class 16E numbers  and 16-335A respectively.

Rebuilding to Class 18E

Beginning in 2000, Spoornet began a project to rebuild Series 2 to 11 Class 6E1 locomotives to Class 18E, Series 1 and Series 2 at the Transnet Rail Engineering (TRE) workshops at Koedoespoort. In the process, the cab at the no. 1 end was stripped of all controls and the driver's front and side windows were blanked off to have a toilet installed, thereby forfeiting the unit's bi-directional ability.

Since the driving cab's noise level had to be below 85 decibels, cab 2 was selected as the Class 18E driving cab primarily based on its lower noise level compared to cab 1, which is closer and more exposed to the compressor's noise and vibration. Another factor was the closer proximity of cab 2 to the low voltage switch panel. The fact that the handbrake was located in cab 2 was not a deciding factor, but was considered an additional benefit.

The known Class 6E1, Series 5 units which were used in this project were all rebuilt to Class 18E, Series 2 locomotives. Their numbers and renumbering details are shown in the table. This list is virtually complete with only seven unknowns remaining:
 The unit number of the Class 6E1 unit that was rebuilt to Class 18E no. 18-851 is not known.
 The status of six units listed as “uncompleted”, of which the existence still need to be confirmed by sighting or photographic evidence. The Class 18E rebuilding program was terminated abruptly in late 2014 with about half a dozen units in various stages of completion on the rebuilding line. Some reports indicated that the incomplete units would be forwarded to Danskraal or Durban for completion, but it could not be confirmed that this actually took place.

Liveries
The whole series was delivered in the SAR Gulf Red livery with signal red cowcatchers, yellow whiskers and with the number plates on the sides mounted on three-stripe yellow wings. In the 1990s many of the Series 5 units began to be repainted in the Spoornet orange livery with a yellow and blue chevron pattern on the cowcatchers. Several later received the Spoornet maroon livery. In the late 1990s at least one was repainted in the Spoornet blue livery with solid numbers and at least four in the Spoornet blue livery with outline numbers. In the Passenger Rail Agency of South Africa (PRASA) era after 2008, at least one was repainted in the Shosholoza Meyl purple livery and one in the PRASA light blue livery.

Illustration
The main picture shows no. E1629 in the Passenger Rail Agency of South Africa (PRASA) Shosholoza Meyl livery. Illustrated below are some of the other liveries in which Series 5 locomotives served.

References

External links

Bo-Bo locomotives
Cape gauge railway locomotives
2910
Railway locomotives introduced in 1974
Union Carriage & Wagon locomotives